Logan Township is a township in Sheridan County, Kansas, United States. As of the 2010 Census, it had a population of 97.

References

Townships in Sheridan County, Kansas
Townships in Kansas